Kung Fu Palace is the first album released by Diego's Umbrella.

Track listing
All song written, performed and arranged by Diego's Umbrella.

Personnel 
 Tyson Maulhardt - Electric guitar
 Vaughn Lindstrom - Acoustic guitar
 Michael Pinkham - Drums
 Kevin Blair - Upright Bass

Additional personnel 
 Yair Evnine - Cello, Electric guitar, Lapsteel Guitar
 Jason Kleinberg - Violin
 Mike Hicks - Vocals
 Arlen Ginsberg - Accordion
 Renee Tyler - Piano
 Prince Marvelous - Facehorn

Production
Produced by John Anaya
Coproduced by Diego's Umbrella
Recorded at Prairie Sun Studios & Humpback Studios
Mixed by John Anaya
Mastered by John Cuniberti

2005 debut albums
Diego's Umbrella albums